Tribolonotus choiseulensis is a species of lizard in the family Scincidae. The species is endemic to the Solomon Islands.

References

Tribolonotus
Reptiles of the Solomon Islands
Reptiles described in 2017